Dušan Lajović was the reigning champion from when the tournament was last held in 2019, but lost to Daniel Altmaier in the quarterfinals.

Carlos Alcaraz won his maiden ATP Tour title, defeating Richard Gasquet in the final, 6–2, 6–2. With the victory, Alcaraz became the youngest player to win an ATP Tour title since Kei Nishikori at the 2008 Delray Beach International Tennis Championships.

Seeds
The top four seeds receive a bye into the second round.

Draw

Finals

Top half

Bottom half

Qualifying

Seeds

Qualifiers

Lucky loser

Qualifying draw

First qualifier

Second qualifier

Third qualifier

Fourth qualifier

References
 Main draw
 Qualifying draw

2021 ATP Tour
2021 Singles
2021 in Croatian tennis